The 33rd Medium Artillery Regiment, Royal Canadian Artillery was an artillery regiment of the Canadian Army Reserve based in Cobourg, Ontario. In 1965, the regiment was reduced to nil strength and placed on the Supplementary Order of Battle.

Perpetuations 

 2nd Heavy Battery, CGA, CEF
 146th Battalion, CEF

Lineage

33rd Medium Artillery Regiment, RCA 

 Originated on 1 April 1946, in Cobourg, Ontario, as the 33rd Medium Regiment, RCA.
 Redesignated on 12 April 1960, as the 33rd Medium Artillery Regiment, RCA.
 Amalgamated on 6 July 1960, with the 22nd Independent Medium Artillery Battery, RCA, with no change in name.
 Reduced to nil strength on 12 February 1965, and transferred to the Supplementary Order of Battle.

22nd Independent Medium Artillery Battery, RCA 

 Originated on 1 May 1866, in Cobourg, Ontario, as the Garrison Battery of Artillery.
 Redesignated on 1 January 1893, as the Cobourg Company of Garrison Artillery.
 Redesignated on 28 December 1895, as the Cobourg Company of Garrison Artillery, CA.
 Redesignated on 15 February 1913, as the Cobourg Heavy Battery, CGA.
 Redesignated on 2 February 1920, as the 2nd Heavy Battery, CA.
 Redesignated on 1 July 1925, as the 22nd Medium Battery, CA.
 Redesignated on 3 June 1935, as the 22nd Medium Battery, RCA.
 Redesignated on 1 December 1938, as the 22nd (Cobourg) Medium Battery, RCA.
 Redesignated on 7 November 1940, as the 22nd (Reserve) (Cobourg) Medium Battery, RCA.
 Redesignated on 1 April 1946, as the 22nd Medium Battery, RCA.
 Amalgamated on 1 September 1954, with the 47th Anti-Tank Battery (Self Propelled), RCA, and Redesignated as the 22nd Independent Medium Battery, RCA.
 Redesignated on 12 April 1960, as the 22nd Independent Medium Artillery Battery, RCA.
 Amalgamated on 6 July 1960, with the 33rd Medium Artillery Regiment, RCA.

47th Anti-Tank Battery (Self-Propelled), RCA 

 Originated on 14 September 1866, in Kingston, Ontario, as the 47th Frontenac Battalion of Infantry.
 Redesignated on 8 May 1900, as the 47th Frontenac Regiment.
 Redesignated on 12 March 1920, as The Frontenac Regiment.
 Converted from Infantry to Artillery on 15 December 1936, and Redesignated as the 47th (Napanee) Field Battery, RCA. A Company, The Frontenac Regiment and “A” Company, 4th Machine Gun Battalion, CMGC are Amalgamated with The Princess of Wales’ Own Regiment.
 Redesignated on 1 December 1937, as the 47th (Napanee) Field Battery (Howitzer), RCA.
 Redesignated on 7 November 1940, as the 47th (Reserve) (Napanee) Field Battery (Howitzer), RCA.
 Redesignated on 24 June 1942, as the 47th Reserve (Napanee) Field Battery, RCA.
 Redesignated on 1 April 1946, as the 47th Anti-Tank Battery (Self-Propelled), RCA.
 Amalgamated on 1 September 1954, as the 22nd Medium Battery, RCA.

Allocated Batteries

33rd Medium Regiment, RCA (1 April 1946) 

 14th Medium Battery, RCA
 47th Medium Battery, RCA

33rd Medium Artillery Regiment, RCA (6 July 1960) 

 14th Medium Battery, RCA
 47th Medium Battery, RCA

Operational History

North West Rebellion 
On 10 April 1885, the 47th Frontenac Battalion of Infantry mobilized a company for active service that served as part of the Midland Battalion in the Alberta Column of the North West Field Force. On 24 July 1885, the company was removed from active service.

The Great War 
On 6 August 1914, the Cobourg Heavy Battery was placed on active service and during the fall of 1914, the battery served in Lévis, Quebec, and Vancouver, British Columbia, providing coastal artillery support.

On 7 November 1914, The 2nd Heavy Battery, CGA, CEF, was authorized and on 15 June 1915, the battery embarked for Great Britain. On 16 September 1915, the battery disembarked in France where it provided heavy artillery support as part of the 2nd Brigade, CGA, CEF in France and Flanders until the end of the war. On 23 October 1920, the battery was disbanded.

On 22 December 1915, The 146th Battalion, CEF was authorized, and on 25 September 1916, the battalion embarked for Great Britain. After its arrival in the UK, on 7 October 1916, the battalion's personnel were absorbed by the 95th Battalion, CEF, where it provided reinforcements for the Canadian Corps in the field. On 17 July 1917, The 146th Battalion, CEF was disbanded.

References 

Artillery regiments of Canada
Medium artillery regiments
Military units and formations disestablished in 1965
1866 establishments in Canada
1965 disestablishments in Canada
Supplementary Order of Battle